The 2010 Soul Train Music Awards were held at the Cobb Energy Performing Arts Center in Atlanta, Georgia on November 28, 2010. The show was hosted by Oscar nominated actor Terrence Howard and  Oscar nominated actress Taraji P. Henson. Performers included El DeBarge, R. Kelly, Erykah Badu, Ron Isley, Lalah Hathaway, Bilal, Cee Lo Green. Tributes were made to artists Ron Isley, and Anita Baker.

Special awards

Legend Award – Female
 Anita Baker

Legend Award – Male
 Ron Isley

Winners and nominees
Winners are in bold text.

Album of the Year
 Usher – Raymond vs. Raymond
 Erykah Badu – New Amerykah Part Two (Return of the Ankh)
 Drake – Thank Me Later
 Alicia Keys – The Element of Freedom
 Sade – Soldier of Love

Song of the Year
 B.o.B  – "Nothing on You"
 Alicia Keys – "Un-Thinkable (I'm Ready)"
 Monica – "Everything to Me"
 Sade – "Soldier of Love"
 Usher – "There Goes My Baby"

The Ashford & Simpson Songwriter’s Award
 Alicia Keys – "Un-Thinkable (I'm Ready)"
 Written by: Alicia Cook, Aubrey Graham, Kerry Brothers, Jr. and Noah Shebib
 El DeBarge – "Second Chance"
 Written by: 	Eldra DeBarge and Mischke Butler
 Drake – "Find Your Love"
 Written by: Aubrey Graham, Patrick Reynolds, Jeff Bhasker and Kanye West
 Fantasia – "Bittersweet"
 Written by: Claude Kelly and Charles Harmon
 R. Kelly – "When a Woman Loves"
 Written by: Robert Kelly

Best Male R&B/Soul Artist
 Trey Songz (tie)
 Usher (tie)
 Jaheim
 Kem
 Ne-Yo

Best Female R&B/Soul Artist
 Alicia Keys
 Erykah Badu
 Mary J. Blige
 Fantasia
 Monica

Best New Artist
 Melanie Fiona
 B.o.B
 Nicki Minaj
 Dondria

Best Reggae Artist
 Gyptian
 Jah Cure
 Vybz Kartel
 Damian Marley
 Gramps Morgan
 Mr. Vegas

CENTRIC Award
 Janelle Monáe
 Corrine Bailey Rae
 Jesse Boykins III
 Dondria
 Dwele

Best Hip-Hop Song of the Year
 Eminem  – "Love the Way You Lie"
 Big Boi  – "Shutterbugg"
 Drake – "Find Your Love"
 Nicki Minaj – "Your Love"
 Rick Ross  – "B.M.F. (Blowin' Money Fast)"
 T.I.  – "Got Your Back"

Best Gospel Performance – Male, Female or Group
 Marvin Sapp
 Lisa Page Brooks
 Fred Hammond
 Youthful Praise 
 Tye Tribbett
 Hezekiah Walker & LFC

Best Dance Performance
 Ciara – "Ride"
 Janelle Monáe  – "Tightrope"
 Ne-Yo – "Beautiful Monster"
 Rihanna – "Rude Boy"
 Usher  – "OMG"

Performers
 R. Kelly
 Ne-Yo
 Erykah Badu
 Gyptian
 Janelle Monáe
 CeeLo Green
 Keyshia Cole
 Rick Ross

Tribute performers

 Anita Baker Tribute
 Chrisette Michele
 Tamia
 Dionne Farris
 Faith Evans
 Kem
 El DeBarge
 Lalah Hathaway
 Rachelle Ferrell
 Goapele

 Ron Isley Tribute
 Eric Benét
 Bilal
 Tank
 Freddie Jackson
 Jeffrey Osborne

Telecast
The Soul Train Awards aired on BET and Centric on November 28, 2010. It was also broadcast on BET UK.

See also
 Soul Train Awards

References

External links
 BET Official website

Soul Train Music Awards
Soul
Soul
Soul
Soul